Andrzej Łapicki (11 November 1924 – 21 July 2012) was a Polish film actor. He appeared in 50 films between 1947 and 1999. He was married twice. His first marriage to Zofia Chrząszczewska lasted from 1947 to her death in 2005. He then married Kamila Mścichowska in 2009 and remained with her until his death.

Selected filmography
 Unvanquished City (1950)
 Tonight a City Will Die (1961)
 Spotkanie w "Bajce" aka Cafe From The Past (1962) 
 Everything for Sale (1969)
 The Wedding (1972)
 The Promised Land (1975)
 Inventory (1989)

References

External links

1924 births
2012 deaths
Polish male film actors
Actors from Riga
20th-century Polish male actors
Polish male stage actors
Recipients of the Order of Polonia Restituta